Gudrun Hänisch (born 6 November 1963) is a former synchronized swimmer from Germany. She competed for West Germany in both the women's solo and women's duet competitions at the 1984 Summer Olympics.

References 

1963 births
Living people
German synchronized swimmers
Olympic synchronized swimmers of West Germany
Synchronized swimmers at the 1984 Summer Olympics
20th-century German women
21st-century German women